The Unit S3U1 is a geological formation in Burgos, Spain whose strata date back to the Late Cretaceous. Dinosaur remains are among the fossils that have been recovered from the formation.

See also 
 List of dinosaur-bearing rock formations

References

Bibliography 
  

Geologic formations of Spain
Upper Cretaceous Series of Europe
Cretaceous Spain
Paleontology in Spain